The United States Intercollegiate Lacrosse Association is an association of member institutions and organizations with college lacrosse programs at all levels of competition, including the three NCAA divisions and non-NCAA schools, at both the varsity and club levels for men and women. The association traces its history through predecessor organizations back to 1882, although it received its present name and became a governing body with unlimited membership in 1926. The association is based in Louisville, Kentucky.

History
The first intercollegiate game in the United States was played on November 22, 1877 between New York University and Manhattan College. Lacrosse had been introduced in upstate New York in the 1860s. Lacrosse was further introduced to the Baltimore area in the 1890s. An organizing body for the sport, the U. S. National Lacrosse Association, was founded in 1879. The first intercollegiate lacrosse tournament was held in 1881, with Harvard beating Princeton, 3–0, in the championship game. New York University and Columbia University also participated.

In 1882 three colleges formed a league called the Intercollegiate Lacrosse Association (ILA), which several others also joined. In most years from this point through 1931, collegiate lacrosse associations selected annual champions based on season records.  In 1899, the Inter-University Lacrosse League (IULL) began play using slightly different rules.  The two leagues merged in December, 1905, to form the 8-team United States Intercollegiate Lacrosse League with Columbia, Cornell, Harvard, Johns Hopkins, Lehigh, Penn, Stevens Tech and Swarthmore.  The USILL was a closed-membership league, which excluded several lacrosse powers, such as the U.S. Naval Academy. The national championship was officially bestowed only upon teams that were included in the membership of these organizations.

In 1906, the USILL established Northern and Southern Divisions, and its by-laws encouraged the annual division winners to play a post-season championship game.  Only two such games were played, in 1912 and 1921.  As Navy was not a member of the USILL, its teams were not eligible for the championship, even though Navy had the best collegiate record in many of those years.  Navy was undefeated from 1917 through 1923, a stretch of 40 games with one tie.

The USILL was replaced by the United States Intercollegiate Lacrosse Association in March, 1926, as an open-membership governing body. In addition to the 12 former USILL teams, Rutgers, Navy, Union College, NYU, Colgate and St. Stephen's (now Bard College) became new USILA members. The USILA bestowed gold medals upon the teams that it selected as national champions through the 1931 season. No official champions were named from 1932 through 1935. In 1936, an award was established in the memory of a Baltimore sportswriter to recognize annually the most outstanding teams. From 1936 through 1972, the USILA executive board awarded the Wingate Memorial Trophy to the national champions.

From 1953–1959, lacrosse divisions were officially named after legendary lacrosse-men.  These were the Cy Miller, Laurie D. Cox, and Roy Taylor Divisions. They were more commonly referred to as Division I, or A; Division II, or B; and Division III, or C.  All college teams were placed in one of the three divisions, dependent upon their records, schedules, and success for the preceding five years, and a point system was created.  Any team of the three divisions was eligible to win the national championship, but this was virtually impossible for non-Division I teams. A Division II team, playing several Division I teams, might have been able to achieve it. A team's record was required to include six games against teams in its own division. Teams were realigned every three years, again reflecting their records. All schools were eligible for the national rankings. The team that achieved the highest point total each year, however, was not guaranteed a solo national championship. The system served as guidance to the USILA executive board, who chose co-champions on frequent occasions.  This point system prevailed with modifications until the NCAA in the early 1970s established the playoff system for determining champions. After 1959, Divisions II and III were realigned by geographical region instead of by team records.

At its 1969 annual meeting in Baltimore, the USILA voted for its first playoff tournament to determine a national champion. In 1971, the NCAA began sponsoring men's lacrosse and began holding an annual championship tournament for Division I schools. The USILA conducted a small college tournament for non-Division I schools in 1972 and 1973 (won by Hobart and Cortland State).  In 1974, the NCAA took over the sponsorship of this tournament through the 1979 season, with separate tournaments being conducted in both 1980 and 1981 for Divisions II and III teams.  The Division II tournament then was discontinued until returning in 1993.

Awards
The USILA has inducted members into the United States Lacrosse Museum and National Hall of Fame annually since 1957.  In addition, the USILA presents annually a number of awards to top collegiate athletes in NCAA  Division I, Division II, and Division III.

Division I awards

Other Awards
Howdy Meyers Man of the Year Award
Frenchy Julien Service Award
Doyle Smith Sports Information/Media Award
Coach of the Year (Division II)
Coach of the Year (Division III)

Champions

ILA champions 1881–1898
U.S. National Lacrosse Association tournament

Intercollegiate Lacrosse Association

USIULL and ILA champions 1899–1905
U.S. Inter-University Lacrosse League and Intercollegiate Lacrosse Association

Bold indicates victory or tie in head-to-head game, or that such game was not played.

* Swarthmore joined the ILA in 1902.  Although not a member of a league in either 1900 or 1901, Swarthmore had a leading team in 1901, which is a credible championship claim.

# Championship or co-championship claims, as published in school media guide, record book or yearbook

USILL champions 1906–1925
The USILL (United States Inter-Collegiate Lacrosse League, also USICLL) was a closed membership organization.  Some strong teams of the era, such as Army and Navy, were never members, so that in some years, the USILL champion was not necessarily the best team in the United States.

The members of the USILL in 1906 were Columbia University, Cornell University, Harvard University, Johns Hopkins University, Lehigh University, University of Pennsylvania, Stevens Institute of Technology and Swarthmore College. In 1907, Hobart College became a member, and Penn withdrew.  As had been the rule for over two decades, 12 players per side constituted a team, and the USILL was split into Northern and Southern divisions, corresponding to the former IULL and ILA, respectively.

Bold indicates victory or tie in head-to-head game, or that such game was not played. Italics indicates victory in intra-division head-to-head game (1909, 1923) or tie-breaker (1922).

* Division champions were selected based on results of intra-division games, difficulty of schedule and number of wins.

# Championship or co-championship claims, as published in school media guide, record book or yearbook

♦ In 1917–1919, World War I and the influenza epidemic curtailed lacrosse activity, as many schools eliminated or reduced schedules. Cornell, Harvard and Hobart did not field teams in 1917–1918. Yale and Johns Hopkins sat out 1917 only. Cornell did not return until 1920.

^ Not a USILL member

USILL championship tally

In four of the 20 years of the USILL's existence (1907, 1923, 1924, 1925), it was difficult to determine the national champion because the division winners did not play each other. In 1907 and 1924, both division winners claimed championships. In the other two years, Cornell (1923) and Maryland (1925) did not. In the war years of 1917 and 1918, Stevens Tech fielded the only Northern Division team to be active both years.  Only one Northern intra-division game was played during that span, thus no Northern Division champion could be declared. However, by virtue of default and one win, the current Stevens Tech record book lists two championships.

† Co-champion

‡ Won a post-season playoff game for the championship

USILA champions 1926–1935
In 1926, the USILL disbanded and formed the USILA as an open-membership governing body. In addition to the former league's 12 schools, six others were soon admitted as members.  From 1926–1931, the USILA executive board awarded gold medals after each season to the teams it selected as the most outstanding in the nation.

† The USILA did not name champions for the 1932–1935 seasons.  The teams listed claim the national championship based on being the leading team in the nation for these years.

USILA champions 1936–1972

The Wingate Memorial Trophy was the award given to the United States Intercollegiate Lacrosse Association (USILA) national champion in men's college lacrosse from 1936 to 1970.

From 1953–1959, all college teams were placed in one of three divisions, dependent upon their records, schedules, and success for the preceding five years, and a point system was created. Teams were required to play at least six games against teams in their own divisions. Teams were realigned every three years.

Intercollegiate championship claims, 1881–1935
In all years it existed (1882–1905), the ILA consisted of 3 to 5 teams, with league championships dominated by a few schools. Likewise, the USIULL had only 3 or 4 teams during 1899–1905, with only Cornell's 1903 league title claimed in the present as a championship. Several schools have claimed their Northern and Southern Division titles won during the USILL years as national championships (based on the results of 3 or 4 intra-division games), while others have not. Still others were acclaimed in their time as unofficial title winners based on being leading teams in the collegiate ranks in particular years.  Non-league members were ineligible for official title consideration before 1926. The USILA awarded gold medals to leading teams from 1926–1931, but made no selections from 1932–1935.

# Championship or co-championship claims, as published in school media guide, record book or yearbook

§ The USILA did not name champions for the 1932–1935 seasons.  School claims national championship based on being that year's leading team.

† Won a tournament conducted for the first collegiate national championship by the U.S. National Lacrosse Association.

‡ Won a post-season championship game between the winners of the USILL Northern and Southern Divisions.

Championships by state

Notes regarding intercollegiate champions

College Lacrosse League active membership by year, 1882–1925
C – Intercollegiate Lacrosse Association (ILA), 1882–1905
U – U.S. Inter-University Lacrosse League (USIULL), 1899–1905
L – U.S. Intercollegiate Lacrosse League (USILL), 1906–1925

The following table considers as inactive, for a particular year, a school that fielded no team (as in war years), as well as a school that did not have, or withdrew from, membership.

See also
 NCAA men's lacrosse championship
 Wingate Memorial Trophy
 College lacrosse

Footnotes

External links
USILA.org
NCAA® Men's Lacrosse Championship Records
Syracuse Men’s Lacrosse Media Guide
Sports Illustrated: USILA Small College Tournament
Lacrosse in the U. S.
Stevens Defeats Harvard at Lacrosse Game practically insures Stevens the championship. The News. Frederick, MD. May 16, 1896. pg 1.
Spalding Athletic Library The Official National Collegiate Athletic Association lacrosse guide (1908)
Spalding Athletic Library The Official National Collegiate Athletic Association lacrosse guide (1909)

College lacrosse in the United States
Lacrosse governing bodies of the United States